Oleksiy "Alexei" Strakhov (born October 16, 1975) is an ice hockey player from Kharkiv, Ukraine, currently playing for HC Dinamo Minsk of the Kontinental Hockey League (KHL), and for the Belarusian national team.

External links

1975 births
Belarusian ice hockey right wingers
Expatriate ice hockey players in Russia
Amur Khabarovsk players
HC Dinamo Minsk players
Khimik-SKA Novopolotsk players
Living people
Ukrainian ice hockey right wingers